Abdul Rahman Abdullah al-Habib al-Rawi is an Iraqi economist and politician, born in the city of Anah in 1920.

He worked as a teacher in the academic year 1945–1946, and then received his doctorate in economics in 1956. He was Undersecretary of the Ministry of Finance and then Minister of Finance in 1967 and 1968.

Publications 

 Cooperation of the Arab Countries in the Field of for Developing Economic Relations with the Gulf States and Emirates, 1972
 International Monetary System and Foreign Trade of the Arab Countries, 1985

References 

Finance ministers of Iraq

1920 births
Possibly living people
Date of birth missing (living people)